Giovanni Giacomo Macedonio (1563–1637) was a Roman Catholic prelate who served as Bishop of Monopoli (1608–1627).

Biography
Giovanni Giacomo Macedonio was born in Naples, Italy in 1563.
On 17 Mar 1608, he was appointed during the papacy of Pope Paul V as Bishop of Monopoli.
On 23 Mar 1608, he was consecrated bishop by Giovanni Garzia Mellini, Bishop of Imola. 
He served as Bishop of Monopoli until his death on 27 Sep 1627.

References

External links and additional sources
 (for Chronology of Bishops) 
 (for Chronology of Bishops) 

17th-century Italian Roman Catholic bishops
Bishops appointed by Pope Paul V
1563 births
1637 deaths